Son of Darkness: To Die For II is a 1991 American romantic horror-drama film directed by David Price. The film is a sequel to To Die For.

Plot
There is something wrong with Nina's adopted son Tyler. The seductive Dr. Max Schreck knows a cure - fresh, young blood.  Schreck, the original Prince of Darkness, has discovered that vampires can lead more normal lives by existing on his hospital's blood supply.  Max attempts to seduce Nina into being his next victim, and together with his son Tyler they will rule over a new age of vampires.  But Tom, Max's jealous brother, has a plot of his own to destroy Max.

Cast
Rosalind Allen as Nina
Steve Bond as Tom
Scott Jacoby as Martin
Michael Praed as Max Schreck / Vlad Tepes
Jay Underwood as Danny
Amanda Wyss as Cellia

Release
The film was given a limited release theatrically at festivals in the United States by Trimark Pictures in 1991.  The film was released on VHS by Vidmark Entertainment in November 1991.

References

External links

1991 films
1991 horror films
American independent films
Dracula films
1990s English-language films
Films directed by David Price
1990s American films